The Visconti Castle or Castello Visconteo of Cassano is a castle of medieval origin in Cassano d'Adda, Lombardy, Northern Italy. It received the current form in the 14th century, when Bernabò Visconti, lord of Milan, enlarged the existing fortification as part of a defensive system of the Visconti dominions on the Adda river. At the end of the 20th century, after a period of abandonment, it was restored and transformed into a hotel.

Location
The Visconti Castle is located near the Adda river on a hill over the Muzza canal. The overlooking position, allowing the control of the river, is believed to have motivated the erection of the first fortification.

History
A castle in the area is supposed to have existed since the Carolingian time. Near the castle, on 27 September 1259, the Battle of Cassano was fought between the two Milanese factions supporting Ezzelino da Romano and Martino Della Torre. The battle ended with the defeat of Ezzelino and the confirmation of the Della Torre family as lords of Milan.

The castle was acquired by the Visconti house after their victory over the Della Torre in the fight for the lordship of Milan. In 1355, it was assigned to Bernabò within the division among him and his brothers Matteo II and Galeazzo II. Between 1355 e 1370, Bernabò, who had received the eastern portion of the Visconti territories, built a defensive line along the Adda river. As part of it, he strengthened and enlarged the castle of Cassano d'Adda, giving to it its definitive shape. The porch with pointed arches in the courtyard and the mullioned windows on the western facades are attributed to Bernabò's period. The wall structure was mainly made up (as can be seen in the unplastered parts) of Adda pebbles alternated with brick rows, a building technique commonly used in medieval fortifications located near the rivers.

In the 15th century, Francesco Sforza consolidated the castle with the imposing buttresses, elevated over the Muzza canal and brick-made. The castle later passed to the d'Adda family and then to the Borromeo family, which motivates the name of Borromeo Castle occasionally given to it.

In the following centuries, lost its military importance, the castle was used for different purposes: warehouse, prison, and recovery for homeless people. In the 20th century, restoration works were undertaken, bringing back the castle to its original features. During these works, Middle Age frescos were discovered on the walls and the vaulted ceilings and accordingly preserved.

Today
The castle today hosts the hotel Castello Visconteo. The interior rooms with mediaeval frescoes are open for the visit of the hotel guests.

The view from the Adda river with its high buttresses characterizes the castle. The façade shows the original mullioned window and, at a lower level, the more recent quadrangular shaped ones.

References

Sources

External links
Official site
Lombardia Beni Culturali – Castello Borromeo, Cassano d'Adda (MI)
Città di Cassano d'Adda - Il Castello

Castles in Lombardy